USS Bonito may refer to the following ships:

 , was acquired by the Navy on 25 May 1846 and commissioned on 30 May 1846. Has often been incorrectly called the Bonita.
 A brig engaged in the African slave trade captured on 10 October 1860 has been identified both as Bonita and Bonito. However, the former slaver was never part of the Navy.

See also
  - Commonly confused with Bonito

United States Navy ship names